Pillco Marca District is one of twelve districts of the province Huánuco in Peru.

References